Abenakiite-(Ce) is a mineral of sodium, cerium, neodymium, lanthanum, praseodymium, thorium, samarium, oxygen, sulfur, carbon, phosphorus, and silicon with a chemical formula Na26Ce6(SiO3)6(PO4)6(CO3)6(S4+O2)O. The silicate groups may be given as the cyclic Si6O18 grouping. The mineral is named after the Abenaki, an Algonquian Indian tribe of New England.  Its Mohs scale rating is 4 to 5.

Occurrence and association
Abenakiite-(Ce) was discovered in a sodalite syenite xenolith at Mont Saint-Hilaire, Québec, Canada, together with aegirine, eudialyte, manganoneptunite, polylithionite, serandite, and steenstrupine-(Ce).

Notes on chemistry and relation to other species
Combination of elements in abenakiite-(Ce) is unique. Somewhat chemically similar mineral is steenstrupine-(Ce). The hyper-sodium abenakiite-(Ce) is also unique in supposed presence of sulfur dioxide ligand. With a single grain (originally) found, abenakiite-(Ce) is extremely rare.

Crystal structure
In the crystal structure, described as a hexagonal net, of abenakiite-(Ce) there are:
 chains of NaO7 polyhedra, connected with PO4 groups
 columns with six-membered rings of NaO7, and NaO7-REEO6, and SiO4 polyhedra (REE - rare earth elements)
 CO3 groups, NaO6 octahedra, and disordered SO2 ligands within the columns

See also
 List of minerals

References

External links

Mindat.org
Webmineral.org

Sodium minerals
Cerium minerals
Silicate minerals
Phosphate minerals
Carbonate minerals
Trigonal minerals
Minerals in space group 148
Minerals described in 1991